John Beauchamp (20 October 1825 – 30 May 1911) was an English first-class cricketer active 1854–62 who played for Surrey. He was born in Chertsey and died in Greenham, Berkshire where he lived. He played in six first-class matches.

References

1825 births
1911 deaths
English cricketers
Surrey cricketers
Sportspeople from Chertsey
 People from Greenham